Alain Ducasse (born 13 September 1956) is a French-born Monégasque chef. He operates a number of restaurants including Alain Ducasse at The Dorchester which holds three stars (the top rating) in the Michelin Guide.

Early life and career
Ducasse was born in Orthez in southwestern France and was educated on a farm in Castel-Sarrazin. In 1972, when he was sixteen, Ducasse began an apprenticeship at the Pavillon Landais restaurant in Soustons and at the Bordeaux hotel school. After this apprenticeship, he began work at Michel Guérard's restaurant in Eugénie-les-Bains while also working for Gaston Lenôtre during the summer months. In 1977, Ducasse started working as an assistant at Moulin de Mougins under legendary chef Roger Vergé, creator of Cuisine du Soleil, and learned the Provençal cooking methods for which he was later known.

In 2012 he held 21 Michelin stars, making him the second ranked chef worldwide in terms of total Michelin stars - Joël Robuchon had 31 and Gordon Ramsay had 17 at the time.

Ducasse's first position as chef came in 1980 when he took over the kitchens at L'amandier in Mougins. One year later, he assumed the position of head chef at La Terrasse in the Hôtel Juana in Juan-les-Pins. In 1984, he was awarded two stars in the Michelin Red Guide. In the same year Ducasse was the only survivor of a Piper Aztec aircraft crash that injured him severely.

Career as chef

In 1986, Ducasse was offered the Chef position at the Hôtel de Paris in Monte Carlo, with management including the hotel's Le Louis XV. After assuring himself that the Hotel's other restaurant operations were operating well, Ducasse continued to run management.

In 1988, Ducasse expanded beyond the restaurant industry and opened La Bastide de Moustiers, a twelve-bedroom country inn in Provence and he began attaining financial interests in other Provence hotels. On 12 August 1996, the Alain Ducasse restaurant opened in Le Parc – Sofitel Demeure Hôtels in the 16th arrondissement of Paris. The Red Guide awarded the restaurant three stars just eight months after opening.

Ducasse came to the United States and in June 2000 opened the Alain Ducasse restaurant in New York City's Essex hotel at 160 Central Park South, receiving the Red Guide's three stars in December 2005, in the first Red Guide for NYC. Ducasse became the first chef to have 3 restaurants awarded 3 Michelin stars at the same time. That restaurant closed in 2007 when Ducasse chose to open a restaurant in Las Vegas named Mix, which later went on to earn one star in the Michelin Red Guide.  In early 2008, Ducasse opened Adour, at the St. Regis Hotel on 16th and K Street in Washington, D.C., and has also opened a more casual Bistro Benoit New York, at 60 West 55th Street.

On 2 July 2011, Alain Ducasse prepared a multi-course gala dinner for the wedding of Prince Albert and Charlene Wittstock. It was the first time Ducasse prepared an official meal for a head of state. He was also in charge of preparing the post-festivities brunch on 3 July, in conjunction with Joël Robuchon.

Recognition
Ducasse became the first chef to own restaurants carrying three Michelin Stars in three cities. The New York restaurant was dropped from the 2007 Michelin Guide because the restaurant was scheduled to close. Ducasse has become known through his writing and influences. Ducasse is also only one of two chefs to hold 21 Michelin stars throughout his career.

He has been special guest in the US and Italian versions of MasterChef. In 2013 he was awarded the Lifetime Achievement on The World's 50 Best Restaurants List. In June 2022 he was recognized by the International Hospitality Institute on the Global 100 in Hospitality, a list featuring the 100 Most Powerful People in Global Hospitality.

Nationality
Ducasse was a French citizen by birth. On 17 June 2008, he became a naturalized citizen of Monaco. He chose Monegasque citizenship in order to take advantage of the principality's tax rates, giving up his 
French nationality as Monegasque people were not allowed to hold dual citizenship at this time.

Restaurants and operations
Alain Ducasse's restaurants, cooking schools, cookbooks, and consulting activities had revenues of $15.9 million in 2002. Ducasse has also opened a cooking school for the general public in Paris and another for chefs (ADF), which also works for the European Space Agency to develop astronaut meals to be taken into space.

Ducasse's restaurants include:
 59 Poincaré (Paris, France)
 Adour (New York, USA) – Closed 17 November 2012
 Restaurant Le Meurice, Alain Ducasse (Paris, France)
 Alain Ducasse au Plaza Athenee (Paris, France)
 Alain Ducasse at the Dorchester (London, UK)
 Aux Lyonnais (Paris, France)
 Allard (Paris, France)
 La Trattoria (Monaco)
 Be (BoulangEpicerie)
 Beige (Tokyo, Japan)
 Benoit (Paris, France) – bistro
 Benoit (Tokyo, Japan) – bistro
 Benoit (Kyoto, Japan) – bistro
 Benoit (New York, USA) – bistro
 Esprit – bistro
 Esterre (Tokyo, Japan) – gastronomy restaurant
 Idam, Museum of Islamic Art, Doha-Qatar gastronomy restaurant
 La Cour Jardin (Paris, France)
 Mix (Las Vegas, Nevada)
 La Terrasse du Parc
 Le Grill
 Le Rech
 Le Jules Verne (Eiffel Tower, Paris, France)
 Le Louis XV (Monaco)
 Le Relais du Parc (Paris, France)
 Le Relais Plaza, Hotel Plaza Athénée (Paris, France)
 La Bastide de Moustier (Moustier Ste Marie, France)
 MIA cafe, at Museum of Islamic Art, Doha-Qatar
 Tamaris (Beirut, Lebanon)
 Rech by Alain Ducasse (Hong Kong)
 Rivea (Saint-Tropez, France)
Rivea (Las Vegas, USA) Mandalay Bay Resort and Casino
 Rivea (London, UK) Bulgari Hotel
 Spoon (Beirut, Carthago, Gstaadt, Mauritius)
 Trattoria Toscana L'Andana (Castiglione della Pescaia, Grosseto, Italy)
Sapid (Paris, France)

In 2004 Alain Ducasse opened a restaurant in a resort near Biarritz, in the French Basque Country. However, after several bombing attacks by Irrintzi, an armed Basque nationalist organization, which accused him of being a speculator and of "folkloring" the Basque Country, Ducasse decided to leave the Basque Country.

In 2010 Ducasse opened a miX restaurant at the W Hotel in Vieques, Puerto Rico, but he closed it in 2012.

On 29 November 2017, Melco Resorts announced that Alain Ducasse would open two new restaurants and a bar at the then upcoming Morpheus Hotel at City of Dreams, Macau. The restaurants are to be called "Alain Ducasse at Morpheus" and  "Voyages by Alain Ducasse". In March 2017, Ducasse opened Rech by Alain Ducass in the Intercontinental Hong Kong.

See also
 List of Michelin three starred restaurants

References

1956 births
Living people
People from Orthez
French chefs
Chevaliers of the Légion d'honneur
French emigrants to Monaco
Naturalized citizens of Monaco
People from Landes (department)
Head chefs of Michelin starred restaurants
Monegasque people of French descent
French restaurateurs